Gerrit Visser  (February 2, 1903 in Nieuwendam, North Holland – December 1984 in Cashmere, Washington) was a Dutch football (soccer) center forward who played in the Netherlands, the United States, and Canada.  He was a member of the Netherlands football team at the 1924 Summer Olympics, and earned seven caps, scoring one goal, with the Netherlands national football team.

Professional
Visser appears to have begun his professional career in the Netherlands, playing for Stormvogels in 1924.  However, at some point, he moved to the United States.  In 1925, he signed with Bethlehem Steel of the American Soccer League.  He saw no playing time until February 1926 when he replaced the departed Archie Stark at center forward.  He then scored four goals in three games.  It appears he moved to Windsor, Canada in 1926.  

He then moved to Detroit, Michigan where he played for Holley Carburetor from 1927 until 1931.  He played in the final of the 1927 National Challenge Cup, losing 0-7 to the Fall River Marksmen. Early in the second half a penalty shot by him was held by the goalkeeper.

National team
Visser earned seven caps, scoring one goal, with the Netherlands national football team.  Four of those games came with the Netherlands Olympic team at the 1924 Summer Olympics.

References

External links
 Bethlehem Steel F.C. Player Profile

1903 births
1984 deaths
Dutch footballers
American Soccer League (1921–1933) players
Bethlehem Steel F.C. (1907–1930) players
Detroit Holley Carburetor players
Footballers at the 1924 Summer Olympics
Netherlands international footballers
Olympic footballers of the Netherlands
Footballers from Amsterdam
Association football forwards
Dutch expatriate sportspeople in Canada
Dutch expatriate sportspeople in the United States
SC Telstar players